The Irresistible Flapper is a 1919 British silent comedy film directed by Frank Wilson and starring Violet Hopson, Ivy Close and Gerald Ames.

Plot
A flapper rescues her less worldly-wise sister from social disgrace.

Cast
 Violet Hopson - Gladys Standish
 Ivy Close - Audrey tremayne
 Gerald Ames - Victor Standish
 Basil Gill - Ormande York
 Charles Vane - Sir Neville Tremayne
 Ruby Belasco - Miss Frewin
 Iveah Stanley - Camille
 Madame d'Esterre - Lady Tremayne
 Frank Wilson - Vicar

References

External links

1919 films
British silent feature films
Films directed by Frank Wilson
1919 comedy films
British comedy films
British films based on plays
British black-and-white films
Flappers
Films about sisters
1910s English-language films
1910s British films
Silent comedy films